{{Speciesbox
| image =
| status = EN
| status_system = IUCN3.1
| status_ref = 
| genus = Scleria
| species = afroreflexa
| authority = Lye<ref>Lye, K. A. and B. J. Pollard. (2003). Studies in African Cyperaceae 29. Scleria afroreflexa, a new species from western Cameroon. Nordic Journal of Botany 23(4), 431-35.</ref>
}}Scleria afroreflexa'' is a species of flowering plant in the family Cyperaceae. It is endemic to Cameroon. It grows on mountain grasslands, including areas of grassland in forested regions. It is threatened by the deliberate burning of the grassland habitat. This plant was first collected in 1999.

References

afroreflexa
Endemic flora of Cameroon
Endangered plants
Plants described in 2003
Taxonomy articles created by Polbot